Carberry is a village in East Lothian, Scotland, UK. 
It is situated off the A6124 road, a mile east of Whitecraig, two miles south east of Musselburgh, and 2 miles north east of Dalkeith.

On September 20, 1745, Charles Edward Stuart set off from Duddingston with his troops via Carberry to meet the Hanoverian army for the Battle of Prestonpans.

Carberry Tower
The 15th-century Carberry Tower is a historic house owned by the Scottish charity Gartmore House. It was previously owned by the Elphinstone family. The late Lady Elphinstone, sister of Queen Elizabeth the Queen Mother, gifted the building to the Church of Scotland.

Battle of Carberry Hill
In June 1567, Mary, Queen of Scots, surrendered to the rebel confederation after the Battle of Carberry Hill, the start of her imprisonment which was to continue for 20 years.

A monument was erected on the estate of the Dukes of Buccleuch, with the legend "M.R. 1567 At this spot Mary, Queen of Scots, after the escape of Bothwell mounted her horse and surrendered herself to the Confederate Lords 15 June 1567".

External links

Gazetteer for Scotland webpage on Carberry
National Portrait Gallery painting by Livinus de Vogelaare, "The Battle-array of Carberry-hill"
National Archives catalogue reference MPF 1/366, Image of Battle of Carberry Hill
Carberry Tower's own website

Villages in East Lothian